The 2009 Monaco GP2 Series round was a GP2 Series motor race held on 22 May and 24 May 2009 at the Circuit de Monaco on the streets of the country. It was the second race of the 2009 GP2 Season. The race was used as a support race for the 2009 Monaco Grand Prix

Report 
The first race once again resulted in a one-two finish for Barwa Addax Team drivers Romain Grosjean and Vitaly Petrov, with Lucas di Grassi promoted to third for Fat Burner Racing Engineering, after Nico Hülkenberg was demoted after cutting a corner.

The red flagged second race was won by Pastor Maldonado for ART Grand Prix, with Jérôme d'Ambrosio and Hülkenberg also on the podium. Romain Grosjean had a big accident in the final stages, where he was unhurt, but it did bring out the red flag which ended the race 2 laps shy of the end.

Classification

Qualifying

Race 1

Race 2

Standings after the round 

Drivers' Championship standings

Teams' Championship standings

 Note: Only the top five positions are included for both sets of standings.

External links
 http://www.autosport.com/news/report.php/id/75554
 http://www.autosport.com/news/report.php/id/75511
 http://www.autosport.com/news/report.php/id/75506

Monaco
GP2
Motorsport in Monaco